Turbonilla hemphilli is a species of sea snail, a marine gastropod mollusk in the family Pyramidellidae, the pyrams and their allies.

Turbonilla hemphilli Bartsch, 1917 is a synonym of Turbonilla vix Pimenta & Absalão, 1998

Description
The shell grows to a length of 13.4 mm.
This  species  is  closely  related  to  Turbonilla dalli,  but  is  more slender,  longer,  with a more  pointed  apex, and  smaller  protoconch. The  less  convex  whorls of the teleoconch are  more  numerous  ribs  and the aperture is  more  elongated.  The suture  is well  marked.

The projecting whorls of the small protoconch are  transverse  to  the  axis. The 12 whorls of the teleoconch are slightly convex. There are about 20 transverse  ribs. These are  rather  stout,  nearly  perpendicular, and rounded. The base of the shell is rounded,  and smooth. The aperture  is squarish,  somewhat  expanded below and with  rounded  angles. The inner lip is  thickened, and  reflected. The entire 
surface  is covered  by  very  fine,  microscopic  striae.

Distribution
This species occurs in the following locations:
 Caribbean Sea
 Gulf of Mexico
 Lesser Antilles
 Mexico
 Atlantic Ocean: off Bermuda

References

 Bartsch, P. 1955. The pyramidellid mollusks of the Pliocene deposits of North St. Petersburg, Florida. Smithsonian Miscellaneous Collections 125(2): iii + 102 pp., 18 pls

External links
 To Biodiversity Heritage Library (7 publications)
 To Encyclopedia of Life
 To USNM Invertebrate Zoology Mollusca Collection
 To ITIS
 To World Register of Marine Species

hemphilli
Gastropods described in 1899